Han (Old Chinese: &ast;) was an ancient Chinese state during the Warring States period of ancient China. It is conventionally romanized by scholars as Hann to distinguish it from the later Han dynasty.

It was located in central China (modern-day Shanxi and Henan) in a region south and east of Luoyang, the capital of the Eastern Zhou. It was ruled by a royal family who were former ministers in the state of Jin that had slowly gained power from the Jin royal family until they were able to divide Jin into the three new states of Han, Wei and Zhao with the assistance of two other ministerial families.

The state of Han was small and located in a mountainous and unprofitable region. Its territory directly blocked the passage of the state of Qin into the North China Plain.. Although Han had attempted to reform its governance (notably under Chancellor and "Legalist" Shen Buhai who improved state administration and strengthened its military ability) these reforms were not enough to defend itself and it was the first of the seven warring states to be conquered by Qin in 230 BC.

Qin invasion of Han's Shangdang Commandery in 260 BC resulted in the Battle of Changping and was allegedly the bloodiest battle of the Warring States period where up to 400,000 soldiers died.

History

Founding
According to chapter 45 of the Records of the Grand Historian, the royal family of Han was a cadet branch of the royal family of the state of Jin. The founder of the Han clan Wuzi of Han was the uncle of Duke Wu of Jin.

Members of the family became ministers in the powerful state of Jin and were granted Hanyuan (modern Hancheng in Shaanxi).

Spring and Autumn period
During the Spring and Autumn period, members of the Han family slowly gained more and more influence and power within Jin. In 403 BC, Jing of Han, along with Wen of Wei and Lie of Zhao partitioned Jin among themselves. In Chinese history, this Partition of Jin is the event which marks the end of the Spring and Autumn period and the beginning of the Warring States. Subsequently, Han was an independent polity.

Warring States Period
Han's highest point occurred under the rule of Marquess Xi. Xi appointed Shen Buhai as his chancellor and implemented his Legalist policies. These reforms improved state administration and strengthened its military capability. Under King Xuanhui (332–312 BC), Han declared itself an independent kingdom.

However, Han was disadvantaged in the competition of the Warring States because Jin's partition had left it surrounded on all sides by other strong states  Chu to the south, Qi to the east, Qin to the west, and Wei to the north. It was the smallest of the seven states and, without any easy way to expand its own territory and resources, it was bullied militarily by its more powerful neighbors.

Defeat
During its steady decline, Han eventually lost the power to defend its territory and had to request military assistance from other states. The contest between Wei and Qi over control of Han resulted in the Battle of Maling, which established Qi as the pre-eminent state in the east. In 260 BC, Qin's invasion of Han led to Zhao intervention and the Battle of Changping.

During the late years of the era, in an attempt to drain Qin's resources in an expensive public works project, the state of Han sent the civil engineer Zheng Guo to Qin to persuade them to build a canal. The scheme, while expensive, backfired spectacularly when it was eventually completed: the irrigation abilities of the new Zhengguo Canal far outweighed its cost and gave Qin the agricultural and economic means to dominate the other six states. Han was the first to fall, in 230 BC.

In 226 BC, former nobility of the Han launched a failed rebellion in former capital Xinzheng, and King An, the last king of Han, was put to death the same year.

Han Xin was made a "Prince" or "King of Han" by Liu Bang after the establishment of the Han dynasty. He was removed to Taiyuan Commandery and the territory of the kingdom of Dai, where he defected to the Xiongnu and led raids against the Han Dynasty until his death.

Culture and society
Before the state of Qin unified China in 221 BC, each region had their own unique customs and culture, although they were all dominated by an upper class that shared a largely common culture. In the Yu Gong (Tribute of Yu), a section of the Book of Documents which was most likely composed in the 4th century BC, the author describes a China that is divided into nine regions, each with its own distinctive peoples and products. The core theme of this section is that these nine regions are unified into one state by the travels of the eponymous sage, Yu the Great and by sending each region's unique goods to the capital as tribute. Other texts also discussed these regional variations in culture and physical environments.

One of these texts was Wuzi (The Book of Master Wu) which was a Warring States military treatise written in response to a query by Marquis Wu of Wei on how to cope with the other states. Wu Qi, the author of the work, declared that the government and nature of the people were linked to the physical environment and territory they live in.

Rulers

Rulers family tree

Famous people
 Han Fei, a Legalist philosopher
 Zhang Liang, a major figure in the early Han dynasty
 Zheng Guo, the hydraulic engineer who designed the Zhengguo Canal for Qin

Han in astronomy

Han is represented by the star 35 Capricorni in the "Twelve States" asterism, part of the "Girl" lunar mansion in the "Black Turtle" symbol. Han is also represented by the star Zeta Ophiuchi in the "Right Wall" asterism, part of the "Heavenly Market" enclosure.

See also
Chinese nobility

References 

Sima Qian. Records of the Grand Historian, Ch. 45
Zizhi Tongjian Volumes 1-6

 
403 BC
States and territories established in the 5th century BC
Ancient Chinese states
Jin (Chinese state)
Zheng (state)
History of Henan
230 BC
States and territories disestablished in the 3rd century BC
3rd-century BC disestablishments
1st-millennium BC disestablishments in China
5th-century BC establishments in China
Former monarchies